Robert Ian Kaufelt (October 7, 1947) is a "pioneer" in upscale supermarkets and specialty foods and the former owner of Murray's Cheese who is credited with turning Murray's into the "Apple Store of fromage." In 1991, he bought Murray's Cheese, the oldest cheese shop in New York City, founded by Murray Greenberg. He turned the store into a nationally recognized "gourmet destination". Kaufelt is an "important presence in the specialty food industry" as an innovative retailer, author of The Murray's Cheese Handbook, educator and "sought-after speaker".

Early life 
Kaufelt was born in Highland Park, NJ to a family of grocers. His paternal grandfather, Irving, was a Polish immigrant who opened Kaufelt Brothers Fancy Groceries in Perth Amboy, New Jersey, in 1920. Kaufelt's father, Stanley P. Kaufelt, owned Mayfair Supermarkets Inc., which operated a chain of 28 groceries trading under the banner of Foodtown. In 1995, Stanley Kaufelt sold Mayfair Supermarkets to the Dutch supermarket company Ahold.

Career

Early career 
After graduating from Cornell University in 1969 with a BA in government, Kaufelt joined Mayfair Supermarket Inc. and eventually became president. He left Mayfair in 1985 to open two specialty stores in Princeton and Summit, NJ, called Kaufelt's Fancy Groceries which was named after the original family grocery in Perth Amboy, NJ. These stores "innovated supermarket quality and service." When the Princeton shop failed in 1987, Kaufelt sold the Summit location and moved to Greenwich Village.

Murray's Cheese 
Upon arriving in New York, Kaufelt approached Louis Tudda, who had bought Murrays from Greenberg in the 1960s and was now losing the lease. He acquired the name and remaining stock. Throughout the 90s, Kaufelt worked behind the counter and did "whatever it took to succeed".

During his tenure as owner, Kaufelt built Murray's Cheese into a "national enterprise", "representing a large share of the specialty cheese market". Three times, Murray's Cheese was named "one of the best cheese shops in the world".  In 2005, Kaufelt was on the cover of Cornell Alumni Magazine and was credited as "leading a cheese revolution". Murray's is noted in the Oxford Companion to Cheese as "worldwide reputation for outstanding quality."

In addition to the flagship location on Bleecker Street in Greenwich Village, Kaufelt opened a branch in Grand Central Terminal in 2002 and a restaurant, Murray's Cheese Bar, in 2012.

Innovations 
After buying in 1991, he added temperature-controlled aging caves in the basement (with a sidewalk window for customers to watch cavemasters practice affinage, or cheese aging). Kaufelt opened a classroom to instruct professionals and the public in cheese and cheese pairings, including a 3-day Cheese U Boot Camp. Nationally, Kaufelt developed the Murray's Certified Cheese Professional (CCP) program, which brought cheese in line with other professional food credentials, such as pastry chefs and sommeliers. Students must pass a rigorous test from the American Cheese Society, a not-for-profit organization founded in 1983 to support the North American artisanal and specialty cheese industry. More than 5,000 attendees have completed the training; hundreds of Murray's Cheese staff in New York and in Kroger supermarkets are certified cheese professionals.
According to Edible Manhattan, Murray's was “a launchpad for many of the most important businesses in the current good food movement.”

Kroger partnership 
In 2005, Kaufelt entered a partnership with Ohio-based Kroger Company. By 2016, the partnership helped expand Murray's Cheese shops to 350 locations in Kroger's across the country. There are currently over 800 Murray's cheese shops in Kroger chains including King Soopers, Ralph's, Fry's, Fred Meyer and others.

In 2017, Kroger purchased Murray's Cheese with Kaufelt staying affiliated as a "strategic advisor." At the time of sale, related businesses included classroom; caves, import company; early online website ('89); catalogue; restaurant; private label; mac and cheese concept.

Publications 
 The Murray's Cheese Handbook (2006) Broadway Books
"Who Moved My Arugula" for The New York Times
 "Fancy Grocery" for Gastronomica
"My Life as the Big Cheese at Murrays" for Forward Online Magazine
Essay in "Greenwich Village Stories, A Collection of Memoirs." (2014)

Awards 
 Prud Homme from La Guilde Internationale des Fromagers (2017)
 Garde et Jure from La Guilde Internationale des Fromagers (2004)

Personal life 
Kaufelt's previous two marriages ended in divorce. A previous relationship, with the Anglo-Irish food writer Tamasin Day-Lewis, was chronicled in recipes & narrative by Day-Lewis in Where Shall We Go for Dinner? and goes into great detail about Kaufelt's travel around the world to find the finest cheeses.

In 2010, Kaufelt married Nina Planck,  a Virginia-born food writer, farmers’ market entrepreneur, founder of London Farmers' Markets and author of The Real Food Cookbook." The couple lives in New York City and in Stockton, NJ, with their children: Julian, born October 24, 2006, and twins Jacob and Rose, born August 4, 2009. In 2010, Kaufelt released an album dedicated to Plank called Sweet Virginia Girl.

References 

Living people
1947 births
Cheese retailers
Businesspeople from New York City
People from Greenwich Village
Cornell University alumni